SM Aura Premier is a large upscale shopping mall located along McKinley Parkway corner 26th Street, Bonifacio Global City, Taguig Metro Manila, Philippines, owned by SM Prime Holdings, the country's largest mall developer. It is the 13th SM Supermall in Metro Manila and 47th SM Prime mall in the Philippines. It is the 2nd SM Supermall to be called "Premier" after SM Lanang Premier. The shopping center is situated near its rival mall Market! Market!, owned by Ayala Malls, a real estate subsidiary of Ayala Land, and affiliate of Ayala Corporation. It is designed by EDGE Interior Designers and Arquitectonica.

Etymology 
The name of SM Aura Premier derived from the two elements gold (which has the chemical symbol Au) and radium. According to SM Prime Holdings, Inc., the name defines “luxury and elegance that emanates from within.”

History 

The mall had its inaugural blessing on May 16, 2013; a day before the grand opening. Numerous celebrities, government officials including Senator Alan Peter Cayetano, Taguig City Mayor Lani Cayetano, company officials, and VIP guests attended the blessing, including SM Prime's Henry Sy and Hans Sy, and Hollywood celebrity Sarah Jessica Parker. Parker cut the ribbon for The SM Store, and was the newest endorser for their "Love to Shop" campaign.

Mall features 

The development includes the Skypark, a multi-level green roof. It has al fresco bars & restaurants, sculptures and botanical gardens, a 1,000-seat performance hall called Samsung Hall and the 250-seat Chapel of San Pedro Calungsod.

Designed by Miami-based architectural firm Arquitectonica, the structure will be a basic “dumbbell” arrangement determined by the narrow site, with the main entry at the north corner, and the office tower located at the southern end. The main vehicular drop-off is provided on the western side, with taxi stations on the first basement, accessed from the lower, eastern road.

The high-end mall consists high-end and international fashion brands such as Stuart Weitzman, Joseph (UK), Calvin Klein, Stradivarius, Uniqlo, Topman, and Topshop. Other tenants include Crate & Barrel, Ramen Nagi, Todd English Food Hall Manila (now The Food Hall), and Fitness First Platinum. 

It also features an SMX Convention Center at the third and fourth floors.

SM Cinema
SM Aura Premier offers a total of five state of the art cinemas with 2 regular cinemas equipped with Dolby Atmos sound system, 2 Director's Club Cinemas, and an IMAX theater at the fourth floor.

Director's Club
SM Aura Premier offers 2 Director's Club Cinemas with in-butler service. It is the second Director's Club Cinema branch after SM Mall of Asia.

IMAX
SM Aura Premier offers an IMAX theater and it is the seventh IMAX theater in the country. In January 2022, the IMAX theater temporarily operated as a "Large Screen Format" (with films shown in non-IMAX DMR releases) due to undisclosed reasons. The IMAX theater resumed regular operations with IMAX DMR releases on May 4, 2022, along with the release of Doctor Strange in the Multiverse of Madness.

Samsung Hall 
Samsung Hall, located at the 6th level of SM Aura Premier, is a 1,000-seat performance theater that has been graced by multiple international acts such as Sungha Jung, Mayday Parade, Charli XCX, Metric, Before You Exit, Oh Wonder, Why Don’t We, and iKon.

SM Aura Office Tower 
The SM Aura Office Tower is built according to international green standards, with efficient use of energy and sustainable operation features. The Office Tower is also home to one of the largest serviced offices in the Philippines, with 400 seats in a  office space. As part of Bonifacio Civic Center, the tower also houses several government offices such as Social Security System, PhilHealth, Pag-IBIG Fund (Home Development Mutual Fund), Philippine Postal Corporation, and Taguig City Government. The Aura Tower also houses corporate offices such as Uber, Lixil Philippines, Cisco, Regent Foods Corp., and Ezaki Glico International.

Awards and recognition 
SM Aura Premier is also the first and sole mall to be certified Gold under Leadership in Energy and Environmental Design (LEED) for its green features in the retail sector in the Philippines. The LEED Certification is an internationally recognized standard awarded to institutions that follow the strict regulations governing green architecture and construction. It is a citation awarded to a distinct few by the US Green Building Council.

Controversies
There is a legal battle between the Bases Conversion Development Authority and the SM Aura Premier. The Bases Conversion and Development Authority (BCDA), in a statement, refuted the claim of SM Prime Holdings Inc. that the controversial SM Aura mall in Taguig City was legally built based on a deed of conveyance (DOC) between the local government and BCDA.

During his term, former Taguig Mayor Sigfrido Tiñga initially went into discussions with the Ayala Group on the use of land. However, the discussions on land use was carried over to the term of his successor, Lani Cayetano.

See also
 SM Megamall
 SM Supermalls
 List of largest shopping malls
 List of largest shopping malls in the Philippines
 List of shopping malls in Metro Manila
 Market! Market!

References

External links

 

Shopping malls in Taguig
Bonifacio Global City
Makati
Shopping malls established in 2013
Arquitectonica buildings